In the Season 2010-11 of the First Division 14 clubs played in the competition. Two teams promoted from the Second Division, these were GBA-Kontich FC and Miecroob Veltem.

K. Sint-Truidense VV were the defending champions. Standard Fémina de Liège won the championship and qualified for the UEFA Women's Champions League.

DV Famkes Merkem and Miecroob Veltem relegated to the Second Division and shall not return in the First Division the next season.

Teams

Standings

References

Bel
2010–11 in Belgian football
Belgian Women's First Division